The 2016 Copa Colombia, officially the 2016 Copa Águila for sponsorship reasons, was the 14th edition of the Copa Colombia, the national cup competition for clubs of DIMAYOR. It began on 10 February and ended on 17 November. The tournament comprised a total of 36 teams, and the winners were Atlético Nacional, who defeated defending champions Junior 3–1 on aggregate score in the final. However, neither Atlético Nacional nor Junior earned a berth to the 2017 Copa Sudamericana for having qualified for the Copa Libertadores, with semifinalists Deportes Tolima qualifying instead.

Format
The competition retained the format used in its most recent edition. The first stage was played by 32 teams, which were split into eight groups of four teams each on a regional basis, where teams played each other of the teams in their group twice. The 8 group winners plus the best 4 second-placed teams joined the teams qualified for the 2016 Copa Libertadores (Deportivo Cali, Atlético Nacional, and Santa Fe) and the previous edition's winners (Junior) in the round of 16, from where the cup continued on a home-and-away knockout basis.

Group stage

Group A

Group B

Group C

Group D

Group E

Group F

Group G

Group H

Ranking of second-placed teams
The four best teams among those ranked second qualified for the knockout stage.

Knockout phase
Each tie in the knockout phase was played in a home-and-away two-legged format. In each tie, the team which had the better overall record up to that stage hosted the second leg, except in the round of 16 where the group winners automatically hosted the second leg. In case of a tie in aggregate score, neither the away goals rule nor extra time is applied, and the tie is decided by a penalty shoot-out. Deportivo Cali, Atlético Nacional, Santa Fe, and Junior entered the competition in the Round of 16, being joined there by the eight group winners and the four best second-placed teams.

Bracket

Round of 16
First legs: July 27, 28, and August 3; Second legs: August 3, 4, 10, 11, and 18. Group winners (Team 2) hosted the second leg.

|}

Quarterfinals
First legs: August 24, 25, 31, and September 1; Second legs: August 31, September 7, and 8. Team 2 hosted the second leg.

|}

Semifinals
First legs: October 4 and 5; Second legs: October 12 and 13. Team 2 hosted the second leg.

|}

Final
First leg: November 13; Second leg: November 17. Team 2 hosted the second leg.

|}

Top goalscorers

Source: Resultados.com

References

External links 
  

Copa Colombia seasons
1